Velashjerd or Valashjerd or Valashejerd may refer to:
 Valashejerd, Razan, Hamadan Province
 Velashjerd, Tuyserkan, Hamadan Province
 Velashjerd, Markazi

See also
 Valazjerd (disambiguation)